David Robert Parry (born March 7, 1992) is an American football defensive tackle who is a free agent. He played college football at Stanford, and was drafted by the Indianapolis Colts in the fifth round of the 2015 NFL Draft.

High school & college
Raised in Daly City, California, before moving to Iowa, Parry attended Linn-Mar High School in Marion, Iowa, and was a three-year varsity letterwinner at offensive and defensive tackle. He then played for the Stanford Cardinal, and in 2014 was a finalist for the Burlsworth Trophy.

Professional career

Indianapolis Colts
On May 2, 2015, Parry was drafted in the fifth round of the 2015 NFL Draft by the Indianapolis Colts. He agreed to terms with the Colts on May 6. Parry started all 16 games in the 2015 season, recording 31 tackles and 1 sack. Parry started all 16 games during the 2016 season recording 47 tackles and 3 sacks, including a game-saving sack against the Packers.

On September 2, 2017, Parry was waived by the Colts.

New Orleans Saints
On September 4, 2017, Parry was signed to the New Orleans Saints practice squad. He was promoted to the active roster on September 20, 2017. He was placed on injured reserve on September 27, 2017.

Minnesota Vikings
On May 16, 2018, Parry signed with the Minnesota Vikings. After playing in both of the Vikings' first two games of the 2018 season, recording one sack against the Green Bay Packers in Week 2, Parry was released on September 19, 2018. He was re-signed on October 16, 2018. He was released again on October 27, 2018.

New England Patriots
On January 9, 2019, Parry signed a reserve/future contract with the New England Patriots. He was released during final roster cuts on August 30, 2019.

Arizona Cardinals
On January 6, 2021, Parry signed a reserve/future contract with the Arizona Cardinals. He was released on August 24, 2021.

Personal life
Parry's mother is of American Samoan descent and served in the United States Army.

On February 25, 2017, Parry was arrested in Scottsdale, Arizona on suspicion of robbery, auto theft, criminal damage, resisting arrest and DUI charges. He was later charged with felony robbery, felony unlawful use of transportation and misdemeanor threats.  On April 26, 2017, he pled guilty one count each of disorderly conduct and attempted unlawful means of transportation. Sentencing was set for May 31, 2017; he is expected to be sentenced to supervised probation.

References

External links
 Profile at Colts.com
 Profile at GoStanford.com

1992 births
Living people
American sportspeople of Samoan descent
People from Marion, Iowa
Players of American football from Iowa
Linn-Mar High School alumni
American football defensive tackles
Stanford Cardinal football players
Indianapolis Colts players
New Orleans Saints players
Minnesota Vikings players
New England Patriots players
Arizona Cardinals players